Quinelorane is a drug which acts as a dopamine agonist for the D2 and D3 receptor.

See also
 Quinpirole

References

Dopamine agonists
Aminopyrimidines